Mohamed Mahgoub Azooz is  an Egyptian Professor of Plant Physiology in Department of Botany, Faculty of Science, South Valley University, Qena, Egypt. He is the Dean of Faculty of Science and one of the "Top 100 Scientists” published by International Biographical Centre, Cambridge-UK in 2011.

Education 
Mohamed Mahgoub Azooz obtained both his B. Sc and M. Sc from Assuit University 1984 and 1990 respectively. In collaboration with Tubingen University, Germany, he obtained his PhD from South Valley University, Qena, Egypt.

Awards 
From 2012 to 2015, he was awarded the scientific publication prizes from both king Faisal University and South Valley University. In 2011, he was listed among  the top 100 Scientists published by International Biographical Centre, Cambridge-UK and in the same year, his name was included  in 28th Edition of  Marquis Who's in the World Biography.

References 

Living people
Egyptian scientists
Egyptian academics
Year of birth missing (living people)